Michael Vincent Lee (born January 19, 1990) is a Filipino actor, model, host from Manila, Philippines. He was a runner up in the reality television series,  Pinoy Big Brother: Teen Edition 1 behind the big winner Kim Chiu.

Biography 
Michael Vincent Lee was born on January 14, 1990, in Manila, Philippines. He graduated with a degree in Management Engineering from the Ateneo de Manila University.

Pinoy Big Brother: Teen Edition 
Mikee gained recognition when he joined the first teen edition of popular Philippine reality show, Pinoy Big Brother. He was given the moniker "Pambato ng Ateneo" (Ateneo's best bet). Inside the Big Brother house, he was linked with fellow housemate Kim Chiu. Most people assumed that they would end up together because both admitted mutual admiration for each other. However, upon going out of the house, Kim has since then been partnered with Filipino-American housemate Gerald Anderson.

Mikee came in second at the series finale of the reality show behind runaway winner, Kim Chiu.

Life After PBB 
Mikee, along with his fellow housemates, joined the show business as part of Star Magic Talents. He has since starred in several teen-oriented shows in his home network, ABS-CBN. He is also part of Y Speak, a talk show of ABS-CBN's sister company, Studio 23. Mikee is also model for Bench, a local clothing brand. Recently, Mikee stars in the TV 5's teen drama, Lipgloss (TV Series). Unlike his previous characters, his role as Maui in the TV show is different, portraying a haughty teenager.

Mikee is also very active and passionate in the world's largest student organization, AIESEC. In 2010, he was vice president for Finance of the Local Committee of AIESEC in Ateneo de Manila University.

Filmography

Television

Film

References

External links
 
 The Melting Pen (Mikee Lee's Blog)

1990 births
Living people
ABS-CBN personalities
Ateneo de Manila University alumni
Male actors from Manila
Filipino male child actors
Filipino male television actors
Filipino male models
Pinoy Big Brother contestants
Star Magic